Robert Michael Gainey (born December 13, 1953) is a Canadian former professional ice hockey player who played for the Montreal Canadiens from 1973 until 1989. After retiring from active play, he became a hockey coach and later an executive with the Minnesota North Stars/Dallas Stars organization before returning to Montreal as general manager from 2003 to 2010. Currently, Gainey serves as a team consultant for the St. Louis Blues as well as a volunteer senior advisor for the Peterborough Petes of the Ontario Hockey League. He was inducted into the Hockey Hall of Fame in 1992. In 2017 Gainey was named one of the '100 Greatest NHL Players' in history.

Early years
Bob Gainey began his hockey career in 1972 with his hometown team, the Peterborough Petes of the Ontario Hockey League. His lack of scoring was made up by his impressive ability to shut down opposing players. This impressed many scouts in the NHL and in 1973, he was drafted eighth overall by the Montreal Canadiens. He was also drafted seventh overall by the Minnesota Fighting Saints of the WHA although he never joined the WHA.

Professional years
As a rookie, Gainey was committed to a defensive style of play. In his second year, he was paired up with stars Yvan Cournoyer and Jacques Lemaire on the second line. In 1976, Gainey was chosen to represent Team Canada at the Canada Cup tournament where he helped Team Canada win the Cup against the Czechoslovakians.
A defensive specialist, Gainey played with the Montreal Canadiens from 1973–74 to 1988–89, winning four consecutive Frank J. Selke Trophies, awarded to the league's best defensive forward, and four consecutive Stanley Cups from 1976 to 1979.

In 1982, Canadiens captain Serge Savard retired from hockey and Gainey was named as his successor. The Canadiens remained successful in the regular season but in the playoffs, they were defeated in the first round three consecutive times from 1981 to 1983. Next season, the Canadiens earned a disappointing record finishing with 75 points only. Despite that, they embarked on a surprising playoff run before being eliminated in the semifinals by the New York Islanders.

Gainey lifted his last Stanley Cup as a player in 1986 against the Calgary Flames, and scored a playoff total of 5 goals and 10 points. Under Gainey's leadership, the Canadiens posted back to back 100 point seasons in 1988 and 1989. In 1989, the Canadiens reached the finals again against the Calgary Flames, a rematch from 1986. This time, the Flames won the Stanley Cup in 6 games. Following the loss, Gainey announced his retirement.

In total, Bob Gainey played in 1160 regular season games, scored 239 goals, and registered 263 assists. He was elected to the Hockey Hall of Fame in 1992. In 1998, Gainey was ranked number 86 on [[List of 100 greatest hockey players by The Hockey News|The Hockey News''' list of the 100 Greatest Hockey Players]].

Post hockey playing years
After his retirement, Gainey moved to France where he was player/coach for the Epinal Écureuils (Squirrels) of the French Nationale 1B division. His unexpected appearance on the French hockey scene created quite a stir as curious fans attended games to see the famous star in action for Epinal. He finished second in scoring for Epinal during the regular season and 18th overall in the Nationale 1B division.

Gainey returned to North America a year later and became head coach of the Minnesota North Stars in 1990–91, guiding his team to the sixth game of the Stanley Cup finals in his first season. In January 1992, Gainey also was named general manager. In 1996, a few seasons after the franchise relocated to Dallas and became the Dallas Stars, he stepped down as head coach to focus solely on his general manager duties. Gainey turned the franchise into a powerhouse by acquiring players such as Joe Nieuwendyk, Brett Hull, Ed Belfour and Sergei Zubov. The team won the Presidents' Trophy in 1998 and 1999. Dallas won the Stanley Cup in 1999.

In 1997, as Stars general manager, Gainey drafted his son Steve Gainey 77th overall in the annual NHL Entry Draft. Gainey won the Stanley Cup a sixth time in 1999 with Dallas.

Along with Bobby Clarke and Pierre Gauthier, Gainey was given the responsibility of selecting Canada's men's ice hockey squad for the 1998 Winter Olympics in Nagano, Japan.

Gainey became general manager of the Montreal Canadiens in May 2003. On January 13, 2006, Gainey fired Canadiens' head coach Claude Julien and stepped in as head coach on an interim basis. At the same time, he hired Guy Carbonneau to work as an associate coach, handing the coaching reins over to him for the 2006–07 season. On July 24, 2006, Montreal Canadiens president Pierre Boivin extended Gainey's contract to 2009–10.

On February 23, 2008, the Canadiens retired Gainey's #23 jersey.

On March 9, 2009, Gainey named himself the interim coach of the Montreal Canadiens after firing Guy Carbonneau. On June 1, 2009, he signed Jacques Martin as the new head coach. On February 8, 2010, he resigned as the Canadiens general manager for personal reasons, and was succeeded by Gauthier. The Canadiens were 28-26-6 at the time of his resignation. He remained on as a consultant to the team until the end of the 2011–12 season, following the firing of Pierre Gauthier, when it was mutually agreed, between Gainey and team President Geoff Molson, that he step down.

On May 9, 2012, the Dallas Stars announced Gainey's hiring as a team consultant.

On October 1, 2014, the St. Louis Blues announced Gainey's hiring as a team consultant.

Awards and achievements
Frank J. Selke Trophy winner in 1978, 1979, 1980, 1981.
Selected to the NHL All-Star Game in 1977, 1978, 1980, 1981.
Conn Smythe Trophy winner in 1979.
Stanley Cup championships in 1976, 1977, 1978, 1979, 1986 (as Player), 1999 (as GM).
Inducted into the Hockey Hall of Fame in 1992.
In 1998, Gainey was ranked number 86 on [[List of 100 greatest hockey players by The Hockey News|The Hockey News' list of the 100 Greatest Hockey Players]].
His #23 was retired by the Montreal Canadiens on February 23, 2008.

 Career statistics 

Regular season and playoffs

* Stanley Cup Champion.

International

NHL coaching record

Personal life
Bob Gainey, with his wife Cathy, were parents to one son and three daughters: Steve (whom he drafted in the 1997 NHL Entry Draft), Colleen, Anna (the president of the Liberal Party of Canada), and Laura.

Gainey's wife Cathy died in June 1995 at age 39 of brain cancer. Gainey's daughter, Laura, died at age 25 in December 2006, when she was swept overboard while sailing in the North Atlantic on the barque Picton Castle, a sail-training tall ship based out of Lunenburg, Nova Scotia, registered in the Cook Islands and destined for Grenada. Laura's body was never recovered, and the U.S. Coast Guard called off the search on December 11, three days after she was swept overboard. During this time, Gainey temporarily passed his general manager duties on to Montreal Canadiens assistant manager (and eventual successor) Pierre Gauthier for four weeks. On January 3, 2007, officials in the Cook Islands named Captain Andrew Scheer to head an investigation into Laura's death. Captain Scheer interviewed the 30-strong crew and examined the ship's logs, emergency equipment and crew qualifications. Laura's death and the subsequent investigations received considerable press attention in Canada, including a documentary produced by the CBC News program The Fifth Estate, which was highly critical of safety standards on the Picton Castle''.

References

External links

 

1953 births
Living people
Canadian expatriate sportspeople in France
Canadian ice hockey left wingers
Conn Smythe Trophy winners
Dallas Stars coaches
Dallas Stars executives
Dallas Stars personnel
Frank Selke Trophy winners
Hockey Hall of Fame inductees
Ice hockey people from Ontario
Minnesota Fighting Saints draft picks
Minnesota North Stars coaches
Minnesota North Stars executives
Montreal Canadiens coaches
Montreal Canadiens draft picks
Montreal Canadiens executives
Montreal Canadiens players
National Hockey League executives
National Hockey League first-round draft picks
National Hockey League general managers
Peterborough Petes (ice hockey) players
Sportspeople from Peterborough, Ontario
Stanley Cup champions
Canadian ice hockey coaches